Smoking in Vietnam is highly common, with an estimated 50% of men and 5% of women using tobacco, an estimated 18 million smokers. 47 million non-smokers in Vietnam are also regularly exposed to tobacco smoke. Vietnam’s Health Education and Communication Center estimates that 40,000 people die annually in Vietnam from first or second hand smoking, and that if nothing is done 10% of the Vietnamese population will have died from smoking by 2030. Smoking is an integral part of Vietnamese culture and exchanging cigarettes is seen as a common greeting.

Thuốc lào
A popular historic form of smoking in Vietnam is called Thuốc lào, where the highly potent leaves of the Nicotiana rustica plant (called Thuốc lào) are smoked through a water pipe which is called điếu cày. A "rít" of thuốc lào is followed by a flood of nicotine to the bloodstream that induces strong dizziness that lasts several seconds, with even heavy cigarette smokers reportedly have had trouble with the smoke and high nicotine content. Side effects commonly include nausea and vomiting.

Smoking Thuốc lào poses serious injury and health risks, and is considered far more dangerous than cigarette consumption. There are several instances of individuals choking to death or suffering sudden respiratory failure due to the sudden inhalation of large amounts of smoke.

However, this is usually attributed to a lack of knowledge and experience. The vast majority of smokers experience little to no adverse affects, compared to cigarette smoking. 
 Despite the risks of Thuốc lào it remains popular in the central and northern parts of the country, especially with minority and rural groups.

Perception and modern day
Many Vietnamese historical figures, such as Ho Chi Minh, were smokers. Smoking is often associated with being manly and educated in Vietnam. Smoking Thuốc lào has come to be perceived by some youth as a sign of being cultured.

References

Vietnamese culture
Health in Vietnam
Vietnam